Bronson Kiheimahanaomauiakeo Sardinha (born April 6, 1983) is a former Major League Baseball outfielder.

Career
Born in Honolulu, Hawaii, Sardinha was drafted directly out of Kamehameha High School in the 1st round of the 2001 Major League Baseball Draft. Sardinha had a mixed minor league career in the New York Yankees organization, playing in a variety of infield and outfield spots.

Sardinha made his major league debut on September 15, against the Boston Red Sox. Coming into the game in the bottom of the 8th inning as a defensive replacement, he got his first at-bat in the top of the ninth inning. Facing Bryan Corey, on the first pitch, he grounded into a game ending double play. Bronson got his first major league hit against the Tampa Bay Devil Rays on September 27, 2007, against Scott Kazmir.

Sardinha was designated for assignment by the Yankees on December 8, 2007, in order to make room for the re-signed Andy Pettitte on the 40-man roster. Sardinha was not offered a new contract by the Yankees and became a free agent on December 12, 2007.

On January 17, 2008, Sardinha was signed to a minor league deal with the Seattle Mariners, and was invited to spring training. Sardinha did not make the team and was assigned to their Triple-A affiliate, the Tacoma Rainiers, but was released early in the season.

On May 6, 2008, Sardinha signed a minor league contract with the Cleveland Indians. He became a free agent at the end of the season and signed a minor league contract with the Detroit Tigers in January . He was released in April 2009.

After a 10-month break from professional baseball, Sardinha signed with the Colorado Rockies on February 8, 2010. He was assigned to their Double-A affiliate, the Tulsa Drillers.

Personal
He has two brothers (Dane and Duke) who also have played professional baseball.

For his unique (middle) name, Sardinha was a part of the first MiLB.com Minors Moniker Madness, held in 2007.   He reached the Final Four out of the Icicle Reeder Bracket, last beating Ari Kafka  before falling to Will Startup, the 2008 winner.

Sardinha runs a company for children called Target Hitting.

Legal issues
In November 2015, Sardinha was arrested in Waipio, Hawaii and charged with fleeing the scene of an accident, assaulting a police officer and resisting arrest after headbutting a police officer. He subsequently pleaded no contest to the charge that he fled the scene. A Hawaii state circuit court initially dismissed the assault charges before being reversed by the Hawaii Intermediate Court of Appeals (ICA). Sardinha appealed the ICA decision to the Supreme Court of Hawaii and oral arguments were heard on July 15, 2021.

At the time of his November 2015 arrest, there was a bench warrant for his arrest for failure to appear on a misdemeanor harassment case. In March 2016, he was granted an adjournment in contemplation of dismissal of the harassment charge on the condition that he complete 29 hours of community service.

In July 2021, Sardinha was arrested in Kapolei, Hawaii and charged with driving under the influence.

References

External links

https://web.archive.org/web/20061016190836/http://www.minorleaguenews.com/baseball/affiliated/a/fsl/yankees/articles2004/060104.html
https://web.archive.org/web/20060616010843/http://yankees.scout.com/2/375310.html
http://www.yesnetwork.com/news/article.jsp?ymd=20070311&content_id=1420682&oid=36019&vkey=4

Living people
1983 births
New York Yankees players
Baseball players from Hawaii
Major League Baseball outfielders
Kamehameha Schools alumni
Gulf Coast Yankees players
Staten Island Yankees players
Greensboro Bats players
Battle Creek Yankees players
Tampa Yankees players
Trenton Thunder players
Columbus Clippers players
Scranton/Wilkes-Barre Yankees players
Tacoma Rainiers players
Buffalo Bisons (minor league) players
Akron Aeros players
Tulsa Drillers players